is an architectural, civil engineering and general contracting firm. It has annual sales of approximately US$15 billion and has been widely recognized as one of the top 5 contractors in Japan and among the top 20 in the world.

It is a family business listed in the Tokyo and Osaka stock exchanges and a constituent of the Nikkei 225 index.

About Shimizu 
The company is named after its founder Kisuke Shimizu, who was born in Koba Village, Etchu (now part of Toyama), and has nothing to do with the former city Shimizu in Shizuoka Prefecture. Kisuke Shimizu formed the company in Edo (now Tokyo) in 1804. The company has been headquartered there ever since.

Shimizu Corporation is an international general contractor, publicly listed on the Tokyo, Nagoya Stock Exchange and the Osaka Securities Exchange and is a constituent of the Nikkei 225 stock index. It has a network spanning Asia, Europe, North America, the Middle East and Africa.

Services offered
 Planning & Consulting
 Development & Financing
 Design
 Construction
 Facility Management
 Maintenance
 Renovation
 Engineering & Technology
 Research & Development

Notable constructions

Japan
 Yoyogi National Gymnasium
 Tokyo Bay Aqua-Line - Aqua-Line tunnel and Umihotaru (an artificial island used as a rest station on the Aqua-Line)
 JR Hakata City
 Haneda Airport runway D
 Fukuoka Airport Cargo Terminal
 Mode Gakuen Cocoon Tower

Asia
 Bãi Cháy Bridge
 Singapore Changi Airport Terminal 3
 Malaysia–Singapore Second Link
 Bính Bridge
 Luzhou Line (Taipei Metro)
 THSR Tainan Station

Dream Megaproject Concepts
Lunar Solar Power Generation - Luna Ring (generation of electricity using a belt of solar cells around the lunar equator)
TRY2025 The Environmental Island - Green Float (botanical city concept)
Shimizu Mega-City Pyramid (a massive pyramid over Tokyo Bay)
Inter Cell City (a sustainable, environmentally conscious city)
Space Hotel (space tourism)
Lunar Bases
Urban Geo-Grid Plan (coordination of facilities above ground and underground for increased efficiency)
Desert Aqua-Net Plan (desert canals)
Ocean Spiral (underwater city)

See also
 Space-based solar power
 Desert greening
 Seasteading

References

External links

 Shimizu Corporation’s Project Green Float

 
Science and technology in Japan
Engineering companies of Japan
Construction and civil engineering companies based in Tokyo
Companies listed on the Tokyo Stock Exchange
Companies listed on the Osaka Exchange
Companies listed on the Nagoya Stock Exchange
Construction and civil engineering companies established in 1804
Japanese companies established in 1804
Japanese brands